= Jonah Gokova =

Zimbabwe activist, feminist, speaker, community organizer, and leader

- Born: Jonah Gokova; January 1, 1956; Zimbabwe
- Occupations: Activist; feminist; speaker; community organizer; grassroots leader
- Years active: 1993–present

Jonah Gokova is a Zimbabwe activist for the causes of feminism, preventing the spread of HIV/AIDS, LGBT rights, and African debt relief. In 2000, he served as the Chair for the Zimbabwe Coalition on Debt and Development, and was awarded the African Prize for Leadership in 2001. He currently serves as the Chairperson on the National Coordinating Committee for Padare, a non-profit dedicated to gender equality. His work counter's gender violence by promoting men's sensitivity to women, and challenging stereotypical notions of male masculinity and dominance over women.

== Sources ==
- Freedman, Estelle B. (2007). The Essential Feminist Reader. Random House. ISBN 9780812974607.
- Gokova, Jonah (1998). "Challenging Men to Reject Gender Stereotypes". Sexual Health Exchange 2 (2): 1–3. PMID 12294333.
